The Sanlam Cape Town Marathon is a City Marathon (42.2 km) held in Cape Town, South Africa, first held in its current form in 2007.  Available distances include the marathon, a 10K, a 5K, and two trail runs of length 22 km and 12 km.  The marathon is held on a fast and flat course, starting and finishing in Green Point, near the Cape Town Stadium.

The Cape Town Marathon is also the host of the South African marathon championships.  The marathon is categorized as a Gold Label Road Race by World Athletics.

History

First iteration 

In 1994, the first iteration of the Cape Town Marathon was organised by Celtic Harriers running club.  It started and finished in Pinelands.

In 1996, the Cape Town Marathon was won by Josia Thugwane, who went on to win the men's Olympic Marathon at the 1996 Summer Olympics in Atlanta, Georgia.

Second iteration 

In 2005 and 2006, a separately organised marathon was also held in Cape Town.

Current era 

The first Cape Town Marathon (in its current format) was run in September 2007. From 2007 to 2013 the race was organized by Western Province Athletics, under a corporate sponsorship agreement with the national federation, Athletics South Africa.  From 2014 its name changed to the Sanlam Cape Town Marathon, and it is being run under a joint partnership between Western Province Athletics, the City of Cape Town and Asem Running. 

The 2013 men's winner Lindikhaya Mthangayi (2:17:02) was stripped of his title in 2014 due to a failed doping test for the steroid methandienone.  The original runner-up Paul Manawa was elevated to first place as a result.

In 2014, 2015 and 2016 it was accredited with IAAF Silver Label status.  In 2017 it was the first African Marathon to achieve IAAF Gold Label Status, which it continues to achieve.  

In 2018, Stephen Mokoka of South Africa set the men's course record at 2:08:31.

In 2019, Celestine Chepchirchir of Kenya set the women's course record at 2:26:44.

The 2020 in-person edition of the race was cancelled due to the coronavirus pandemic, with all registrants given the option of obtaining a full refund.

Other races 

In addition to the marathon, the event includes the Sanlam Cape Town 10 km PEACE RUN / Walk, the Sanlam Cape Town Peace Trail Runs (12 km & 22 km) and the Sanlam Cape Town 5 km PEACE RUN / Walk.

Environmental impact 

The marathon is accredited as a Climate Neutral event and achieved zero waste to landfill.

Sponsorship 

The marathon is sponsored by Sanlam and City of Cape Town.

Winners 

Key:

Multiple wins

By country

See also
Sport in South Africa

Notes

References

List of winners
ARRS - Race series: Nedbank Cape Town. Association of Road Racing Statisticians. Retrieved on 2015-09-21.

Marathons in South Africa
Sport in Cape Town
Recurring sporting events established in 2007
2007 establishments in South Africa